Aeronautical phraseology is a set of communication rules for simplified English language communication between an air traffic controller and the pilot in command of an aircraft. In the majority of countries, the aeronautical phraseology in use is based on standards developed by the International Civil Aviation Organization.

Goals of aeronautical phraseology
A primary goal of concise aeronautical phraseology is to enhance communication between pilot and control tower.

Brevity is a further goal, since shorter communications segments mean the airwaves are available for other aircraft to contact the ATC.

The use of slang, jargon and chatting are strongly discouraged.

Structure
Radio contacts using aeronautical phraseology begin with an identifier call sign in the case of a pilot, or the name of the airport in the case of the control tower.

See also
 List of aviation, aerospace and aeronautical abbreviations
 FAA Order 7110.65
 Procedure word
 Radiotelephony procedure

References

Aeronautics
Air traffic control